VOEA Late (C315) is a landing craft operated by the Tongan Maritime Force designed by Incat Crowther and built by Forgacs Marine and Defence in Newcastle, New South Wales.

Operational history 
During the 2022 Hunga Tonga–Hunga Ha'apai eruption and tsunami VOEA Late provided logistics support to outlying islands.

References 

Naval ships of Tonga
Ships built in New South Wales